Per-Egil Hough Flo (born 18 January 1989) is a Norwegian footballer who plays as a defender for Sogndal. He is the nephew of Håvard Flo and cousin-nephew of Jostein Flo, Jarle Flo and Tore André Flo.

Career

Club
After progressing through Sogndal Fotball's youth team, Flo went on to play for the first team in the 2006 season, before he joined Molde in July 2013.

On 29 December 2016, Molde announced that Flo had left the club to sign a 2.5-year contract with Slavia Prague. On 17 July 2018, Flo signed for the Swiss club Lausanne-Sport.

Career statistics

Club

International

Statistics accurate as of match played 13 June 2017

Honours
Sogndal
 Adeccoligaen (1): 2010
Molde
 Tippeligaen (1): 2014
 Norwegian Cup (2): 2013, 2014
Slavia Prague
 HET liga (1): 2016–17
 MOL Cup (1): 2017–18
Lausanne-Sport
 Swiss Challenge League (1): 2019–20

References

External links
 Per-Egil Flo at Sogndal Fotball's homepage
Profile at Football Association of Norway

1989 births
Living people
Norwegian footballers
Norway under-21 international footballers
Norway international footballers
Association football forwards
Sogndal Fotball players
Molde FK players
Norwegian First Division players
Eliteserien players
SK Slavia Prague players
FC Lausanne-Sport players
Norwegian expatriate footballers
Expatriate footballers in the Czech Republic
Norwegian expatriate sportspeople in the Czech Republic
Expatriate footballers in Switzerland
Norwegian expatriate sportspeople in Switzerland
People from Stryn
Flo family
Sportspeople from Vestland